The GameCity Prize is an annual games prize celebrating games as a form of cultural expression. Established in 2011 as part of the annual GameCity festival, the prize seeks "to drive understanding and appreciation of videogames within a wider cultural context".

Nominations are made by a secret Academy of experts, who are asked to select the six games they deem to be the most "interesting and exciting released in the previous twelve months". A jury of non-gamers is then convened to consider the shortlist, first by playing the games and then meeting to select the one game they consider to be "the most interesting, exciting and excellent".

The prize has been described as "gaming's answer to the Bookers", although it has been pointed out that the comparison is flawed in the sense of scope since the GameCity Prize is not specifically designed to reward British games.

Winners and shortlisted nominees

References

External links

Video game awards
Awards established in 2011